Abu Abdullah Muhammad al-Arabi al-Darqawi (1760–1823) was a Moroccan Sufi leader of the Shadhili tariqa and the author of letters concerning the dhikr he preached and instructions for daily life. He stressed noninvolvement in worldly affairs (Dunya) and spoke against other Sufi orders exploiting claims of barakah (blessings). He was imprisoned by the Moroccan ruler Mulay Slimane (r. 1792–1822) for supporting revolts against the throne, but was released by Abderrahmane (r. 1822–1859). 

A branch of the Shadhili order, the Darqawa, was organized around his teachings after his death, with members coming from a wide range of social groups. Though the Darqawa was once the most important tariqah in Morocco, its power waned as it spread throughout North Africa.
Al-Darqawi was descended from  the Beni Zerwal Berbers, in the Rif. His tomb is in the Zawiya Bou Brih also in the Rif.

His Letters

Almost all of the letters concern the method based on the central techniques of invocation or dhikr, not usually discussed openly by Sufi masters. The letters were compiled by al-`Arabi al-Darqawi himself, copied by his disciples and printed many times in Fez, in lithographed script. Titus Burckhardt has made this translation on the basis of two nineteenth-century manuscripts as well as the lithographed edition.

Shaykh Ibn 'Abbas, Sayyidi Ahmad ibn Muhammad az-Zagari al-Hasani, known as Ibn al-Khayyat, wrote concerning Sayyidna Moulay al-Arabi ad-Darqawi, as a way of introduction to Moulay al-Arabi's Risala:

In the Name of Allah, the most Beneficent the most Merciful

Salutations and peace upon our master Muhammad and his family. Whoever answers his call is happy. Whoever is arrogant or shy continues with the hobbling-cord of his sickness. SubhannAllah (Glory be to God, Allah)! He purifies the hearts of whomever He wills of His slaves and makes them Imams in the path of guided conduct. They travel on the Path to Allah and they recognize its states. They have insight into the machinations of the nafs. They know its actions. Their Master has guided them to His Path after much striving. Their selves have been put to rest after struggle and suffering. They have drawn near to their Master with sincere intention and their Master has drawn near to them as befits the sublime essence.

These are the letters of the Sheikh, the Imam, the Ghawth (spiritual axis, pole) who benefits the elite and the common, the famous wali (saint) and great siddiq (truthful one), the perfect realized gnostic, the one who has arrived, who is drowned in the sea of Tawhid (oneness of Allah), utterly crushed and annihilated in the immensity of the sublime essence, who is firmly established and firmly rooted, the lofty mountain that joins the shari'at of our master Muhammad (peace and blessings of Allah upon him) and the haqqiqa (spiritual tasting), bewildered in every station of his realization, the Cave of mankind and the shelter of the elite and common. He is the sign, ayyat, of the Merciful and the rarity of the age, the word of Allah from His direct presence, and the shelter of His resplendent tajalli-manifestation. He is the Sharif ad-Darqawi al-Hasani, the teacher, endowed with noble qualities, our lord and master al-Arabi, may Allah give us the benefit of his baraka and send back some of his fragrant breeze to us. He is loved by those from who the veils have been lifted
and from whom others are distant. The cosmos is crushed and annihilated in their eyes since they see He is One, the Conqueror. What contemplation it is! How sweet it is! What a station it has! How high they are!

Regarding his letters, it is a drink that is clear and pure for the thirsty. All examinations agree that the knowledge of their author is an overflowing sea. In them are the commands and words of the shari'at of Muhammad, and the sunnah and actions of the tariqa, and the secrets and states of the reality, Haqqiqa.

O brother (and sister)! Grab on to them and act according to them. Take on their character. All that there is in them is the shari'at of the master of the Messengers, peace and blessings of Allah upon him and his family, the path of the wayfarers, indications of the realized gnostics who have arrived, and the ecstasies of the beloved lovers. They, like their author, are well-known and famous in every land. They are spread out as this Darqawi Tariqa is spread out, the group of the dutifully obedient, may Allah have mercy upon all of them (those of the past, the future, and the current brotherhood) .

I said: Moulay al-Arabi ad-Darqawi, the author of these letters, may Allah be well pleased with him, was the answer for this world in the heart of the sources. How many people who had blind eyes, heedless hearts, and ears deaf to perception of the divine presence were opened by Allah at his hand, and the hand of his companions and heirs after him! They were not aware and now their hearts have found a nest and their spirits a residence, may Allah profit us by their baraka.

Moulay al-Arabi ad-Darqawi revitalized the Shadhili Tariqa and filled North Africa with tassawuf, having trained and authorized thousands of others who were qualified to take seekers by the hand, by the permission of Allah, glorified is He; his tariqa spread primarily via Sheikh Ahmad ibn Mustapha 'Alawi of Mostaganem, Algeria and Sheikh Muhammad ibn Habib of Meknes, Morocco to Syria, Jordan, Palestine, the US, Canada, Europe. Sheikh Nuh Ha Mim Keller, Sheikh Abdelqadir As Sufi, Sheikh Muhammad Yaqubi, and Ahmad Salah As Sufi, India and Pakistan and others have later further spread the tariqa to Western lands by the grace of the Beneficent.

See also
 Ahmad ibn Ajiba
 Muhammad Abul-Huda al-Yaqoubi

References

 Al 'Arbi Al Darqawi, Majmu'at Rasa'il (Letters from Al Darqawi to his disciples), Casablanca, 1999
 The Darqawi Way (The Letters of Al-Arabi al-Darqawi translated by Aisha Bewley), Diwan Press, Norwich UK, 1980, 
 Letters of a Sufi Master, The Shaykh ad-Darqawi, Shaykh al-'Arabi ad-Darqawi, Translated by Titus Burckhardt, Preface by Martin Lings, Fons Vitae (1998) 

Sunni Sufis
Darqawi
Shadhili order
Founders of Sufi orders
Asharis
Sunni imams
Sunni Muslim scholars of Islam
Moroccan Sufi writers
Moroccan letter writers
Moroccan religious leaders
People from Fez, Morocco
18th-century Moroccan people
19th-century Moroccan people
1760 births
1823 deaths